The John Holliday House, also known as Holliday Haven. is a historic mansion in Aberdeen, Mississippi, U.S.. It was built in the 1850s for John Holliday, a North Carolinian who owned a plantation west of Aberdeen called Holliday Place. It was designed in the Greek Revival architectural style. It has been listed on the National Register of Historic Places since February 22, 1988.

References

Houses on the National Register of Historic Places in Mississippi
Greek Revival architecture in Mississippi
Houses completed in 1850
Houses in Monroe County, Mississippi
National Register of Historic Places in Monroe County, Mississippi
1850 establishments in Mississippi